Dębniczka  is a village in the administrative district of Gmina Damnica, within Słupsk County, Pomeranian Voivodeship, in northern Poland.

The village has a population of 44.

References

Villages in Słupsk County